Newcastle Entertainment Centre is a multi-purpose Australian arena within the Newcastle Showgrounds. It was opened in 1992.

The centre's original tenant was the Newcastle Falcons NBL team who moved to the new venue in 1992 from their previous home at the Broadmeadow Basketball Stadium. After the Falcons folded at the end of the 1999 season its only tenant was the Hunter Jaegers netball team who played in the Commonwealth Bank Trophy. The Jaegers played in the centre from 1997 until 2008. From 2003 the NEC served as the home court for another NBL team, the Hunter Pirates (formerly the Canberra Cannons before the team was moved to Singapore to become the Singapore Slingers after the 2005-06 NBL season).

The Newcastle Showgrounds themselves also housed the early Newcastle Rebels back in 1908-1909. This rugby league franchise played two seasons in the New South Wales Rugby League premiership.

The Entertainment Centre is renowned for being one of Australia's most flexible multi-purpose stadiums, able to accommodate sports events, various performances and expos. The Newcastle Show uses the Centre for various displays and the showbag area. The stadium has also played host to some of Kostya Tszyu's early fights as an Australian-based fighter.

The venue has a seating capacity of 4,658. The stadium is air-conditioned (installed as a requirement of the NBL when it moved to playing in the summer), equipped with top-grade lights, and also has scoreboards used for basketball and netball games. The venue is owned by Venues NSW and operated by ASM Global.

Purpose 
The Newcastle Entertainment Centre was built as a multi-purpose facility to host concerts, sporting events, exhibitions and functions.

Modes

Concert 
The Centre has the following capacities in its different concert modes:
 General Admission mode - up to 7,528 patrons
 End Stage mode - up to 6,193 patrons seated
 Reduced mode - variable between 2,500 and 7,528 patrons

Curtaining allows the adapting of the venues to suit more intimate modes for performers.

The centre has played host to concerts by many nationally and internationally renowned performers including Tina Arena, Cher, Celine Dion, John Farnham, Lady Gaga, Kylie Minogue, Katy Perry, Pet Shop Boys, P!nk, Powderfinger, Cliff Richard, Silverchair, Taylor Swift and The Wiggles.

Sports 
The Centre has hosted numerous basketball, netball, boxing, bull riding, ice staking and tennis events. In sports mode, the Centre can accommodate between 2,000 and 5,000 patrons.
When Newcastle's team competed in the NSWRFL Premiership in 1908 and 1909, the Newcastle Showground was used as the team's home ground.

The Newcastle Showground has also been home to Motorcycle speedway on and off since 1926, including hosting the first five recognised Australian Solo Championships. The showground speedway also hosted the Australian Sidecar Speedway Championship in 2010. Originally a ½ mile track, its length has been reduced in recent years by about half.

Exhibition 
The seating in the venue is fully retractable providing 4,100 square metres of clear span exhibition space.

Function 
The Centre is able to host functions catering up to 2,000 guests.

References

External links 
 

Basketball venues in Australia
Boxing venues in Australia
Defunct National Basketball League (Australia) venues
Indoor arenas in Australia
Music venues in Australia
Netball venues in New South Wales
New South Wales Swifts
Newcastle Falcons (basketball)
Newcastle, New South Wales
Sports venues in New South Wales
Sports venues completed in 1992
1992 establishments in Australia